A blood feud is a feud, usually between families, with a cycle of retaliatory violence.

Blood Feud may also refer to:

Film and television 
 Blood Feud (1978 film), an Italian thriller by Lina Wertmüller
 Blood Feud (1983 film), a TV miniseries starring Robert Blake
 Pumpkinhead: Blood Feud, a 2007 television horror film
 "Blood Feud" (The Simpsons), a 1991 episode of The Simpsons
 "Blood Feud" (Zevo-3), an episode of Zevo-3
 "Blood Feud", an episode of The Rough Riders
 "Bloodfeud", an episode of The Borderers

Other uses
 Blood Feud (novel), a 1976 historical fiction novel by Rosemary Sutcliff
 Blood Feud (Sharp book), a 2011 non-fiction book by Kathleen Sharp
 Rohan: Blood Feud, a 2008 computer game

See also
 Feud (disambiguation)
 Vendetta (disambiguation)